Monstrous Regiment Publishing is an independent micropublisher based in Edinburgh. The company was set up by Ellen Desmond and Lauren Nickodemus, two graduates of Edinburgh Napier University. It publishes texts that focus on ‘intersectional feminism, sexuality and gender’.

Background 
Desmond and Nickodemus decided to set up Monstrous Regiment Publishing following their graduation from a publishing course at Edinburgh Napier University. They have stated that they established the company after many of their peers moved to London to seek employment in creative industries, feeling there was a lack of opportunities in Scotland. The company is financed by online crowd-funding. Desmond and Nickodemus run Monstrous Regiment part-time, alongside their jobs.

Nickodemus is from Michigan and works in book marketing and sales by day. Desmond was awarded Ireland’s Best Student Editor in 2016 and nominated for an SAAI Award for her contribution to Irish student media and publishing.

The company is named after the John Knox text The First Blast of the Trumpet Against the Monstruous Regiment of Women which argued against women in government.

Monstrous Regiment’s mission statement is ‘decentralise and democratise the publishing industry and give voices to local and minority artists.’

Published Works 
Monstrous Regiment published The Bi-ble in 2017, ‘a non-fiction anthology about bisexuality’, funded by a Kickstarter campaign. The book is made up of personal essays and was co-edited by Desmond. Prior to publications, authors submitted essays over a six-week period before a month-long editing process.

Nickodemus states that The Bi-ble was inspired by works such as Nasty Women, No Filter and Pride, Not Prejudice.

In an interview in April 2020, Desmond and Nickodemus stated that The Bi-ble came out of a desire to highlight issues and experiences around bisexuality. The pair shared their hope that the anthology would help readers to become more compassionate and empathetic about the issues that face bisexuality which they stated,'inhabit[s] a liminal space between cultures, often misunderstood and criticised by both the straight community and the LGBT community alike.'As of April 2020, Monstrous Regiment are developing another anthology named So Hormonal: Personal Stories About Hormones. They are also fundraising to create a second volume of The Bi-ble, Volume Two: New Testimonials.

Desmond and Nickodemus have spoken of the importance of Anthologies, stating:‘Anthologies often give a platform to writers and topics that previously weren’t given the shelf space they deserve, which is what we set out to do. They have the power to address or debunk popular narratives and assumptions by recording the truth of many individual writers’ lives and experiences.’The company is also publishing a magazine of feminist fiction, poems and art by Scottish contributors. Desmond and Nickodemus shared in an interview that they will be publishing their first fiction text in later 2020.

Monstrous Regiment published their first full length work of fiction in March 2021 - a coming-of-age novel ‘Duck Feet’ by Ely Percy. It went on to win Scotland’s Book Of The Year at the Saltire Society’s award ceremony in November of the same year.

References

External links 
 

LGBT culture in Edinburgh
Scottish publishers (people)
Book publishing companies of the United Kingdom
Feminist books